Or Erez (Hebrew: אור ארז; born 7 September 1982) is an Israeli footballer who plays as a midfielder for Liga Neumit club Hapoel Ironi Petah Tikva. She previously played for Maccabi Holon, with which she has also played in the European Cup. She is a member of the Israeli national team, where she made her debut in the 2007 World Cup qualifying. She has scored two goals for Israel, including a winner over Kazakhstan in the 2011 World Cup qualifying.

Club career
Erez started her career in Hapoel Petah Tikva before transferring to Maccabi Holon, where she played ever since. With Maccabi Holon Erez won 6 championships and 9 cups, including scoring the winning goal in the 2003 cup final.

International career
Erez made her international debut for Israel women's national football team in 2006 against Estonia and so far played a total of 31 matches for the national team, scoring two goals. Erez also played for the U-19 national team, making ten appearances and scoring two goals.

Honours
Championships (6):
With Maccabi Holon: 2002–03, 2004–05 , 2005–06, 2006–07, 2007–08, 2008–09
Cup (9):
With Maccabi Holon: 2002–03, 2003–04, 2004–05, 2005–06, 2006–07, 2007–08, 2008–09, 2009–10, 2012–13

References

External links

1982 births
Israeli Jews
Living people
Israeli women's footballers
Israel women's international footballers
Hapoel Petah Tikva F.C. (women) players
Maccabi Holon F.C. (women) players
Women's association football midfielders
Footballers from Petah Tikva